Nieuwenhuis's skink (Lamprolepis nieuwenhuisii) is a species of skink. It is found in Borneo.

Etymology
The specific name, nieuwenhuisii, is in honor of Dutch explorer and ethnologist Anton Willem Nieuwenhuis.

References

Lamprolepis
Reptiles described in 1905
Reptiles of Indonesia
Reptiles of Malaysia
Taxa named by Theodorus Willem van Lidth de Jeude
Reptiles of Borneo